The Hudson Canyon is a submarine canyon that begins from the shallow outlet of the estuary at the mouth of the Hudson River. It extends out over  seaward across the continental shelf finally connecting to the deep ocean basin at a depth of 3 to 4 km below sea level. It begins as a natural channel of several kilometers width, starting as a  20–40 m depression at Hudson Channel southward from Ambrose Light, then carving through a deep notch of about 1 km depth in the shelf break, and running down the continental rise. Tidally associated flows of about  up and down the deeper parts of the canyon have been recorded. As silt, sand and mud are carried down the Hudson River, they flow into the canyon and out into the deep sea.

It is the largest known ocean canyon off the East Coast of the United States, and one of the largest submarine canyons in the world. Over an  distance, the average slope of the canyon floor is 1.5°.

The river discharged sediment that helped carve the canyon aided by underwater avalanches of mud and sand. Recent maps of the canyon reveal tributaries of an extraordinary underwater drainage network that is strikingly similar to terrestrial rivers. Tidal currents sweep up and down the channel; and on occasion, during big storms, cold ocean water is pushed up the Hudson Canyon to spread out on the shelf. Thus the Hudson Canyon continues to be cut by traveling sediments.

"Hudson Canyon" also designates a location marked by a navigational buoy indicating the seaward end of the vessel traffic separation scheme of the Hudson Canyon–Ambrose lanes which lead into and out of New York Harbor for Atlantic shipping.

References
Notes

Bibliography
 Butman, Bradford, Twichell, David C., Rona, Peter A., Tucholke, Brian E.,  Middleton, Tammie J., and Robb, James M., 2006, "Sea Floor Topography and Backscatter Intensity of the Hudson Canyon Region Offshore of New York and New Jersey". U.S. Geological Survey Open-File Report 2004-1441, Version 2.0.

External links 

 NOAA Hudson Canyon Expedition 2002
 NOAA Hudson Canyon Page

Submarine canyons of the Atlantic Ocean
Hudson River